Art Kassel (c. 1904 – February 3, 1965) was an American singer-songwriter and saxophonist.

References

External links
 Art Kassel recordings at the Discography of American Historical Recordings.

1900s births
1965 deaths
Musicians from Chicago
Musicians from Los Angeles
People from Van Nuys, Los Angeles
American male singer-songwriters
American male saxophonists
20th-century American saxophonists
20th-century American male singers
20th-century American singers
Singer-songwriters from California
Singer-songwriters from Illinois